St. Gabriel Catholic Church is a church parish in St. Gabriel, Louisiana known to have its origins all the way back to 1761. It is noted as the oldest still standing church in the entirety of the Louisiana Purchase. The church parish includes a main church and the Sacred Heart Chapel in the neighborhood of Carville, Louisiana. The church is part of the Diocese of Baton Rouge and its current pastor is Father Charlie Landry. The old parish church building was listed on the National Register of Historic Places on November 27th, 1972.

History 
The church's history dates back to when the original white church building was completed in 1776. This church is thought to be the oldest church building on all of the territory gained from the Louisiana Purchase. Around the turn of the twentieth century, the church had to be moved a little further away from the river to what is now its actual site. The timbers were found to be in perfect condition and in the tower is the original bell of the parish, which is still used. It bears the inscription, “Sancta Maria de la Merced, Ora Pro Nobis-Se Hizo-Commendodos-MRPI Ygnacio de Jesus Maria-Ano de 1768.” Father Vincent Isidore Kleinpeter, a pastor at St. Gabriel, believed a new church building was needed, but the old building should still stand on the site in which it was moved.

Repairs 
In 2008, Hurricane Gustav destroyed the original steeple of the original church. Following the hurricane, it was later repaired.

See also
National Register of Historic Places listings in Iberville Parish, Louisiana

References

Roman Catholic churches in Louisiana
Churches on the National Register of Historic Places in Louisiana
Roman Catholic churches completed in 1772
Buildings and structures in Iberville Parish, Louisiana
National Register of Historic Places in Iberville Parish, Louisiana
18th-century Roman Catholic church buildings in the United States
1770 establishments in North America
Religious organizations established in 1770
Roman Catholic churches completed in 1953